WSJS (600 AM) is a commercial radio station licensed to Winston-Salem, North Carolina, and broadcasting to the Greensboro/Winston-Salem/High Point media market. It airs a talk and sports radio format. WSJS is owned by the Truth Broadcasting Corporation, with studios and offices in The Factory Building on North Main Street in Kernersville. 

WSJS's AM transmitter is near Robinhood Road in Winston-Salem. The station operates with 5,000 watts, using a directional antenna with a four-tower array. WSJS is also heard on four FM translators: 93.7 W229CH in Greensboro, 101.5 W268CG in Winston-Salem, 103.1 W276DS in Winston-Salem and 104.9 W285EU in High Point.

Programming
On weekdays, WSJS has a talk radio format.  Early weekday mornings, the station carries two syndicated shows, Our American Stories with Lee Habeeb and America in The Morning with John Trout.  In morning drive time, Jeffrey Griffin hosts Triad Today.  In middays, syndicated shows include Brian Kilmeade, Todd Starnes and Charlie Kirk.  Sports shows begin in afternoon drive time, starting with The Drive with Josh Graham.  In the evening, syndicated shows include Rich Eisen and CBS Sports Radio.  

Weekends feature live sports as well as CBS Sports Radio and Westwood One sports programming.  Some paid brokered programming and religious shows air on weekend mornings.  During talk programming hours, WSJS carries hourly updates from Townhall Radio News.

History

1930s–1960s
In the late 1920s, entrepreneur and radio engineer Doug Lee began talking with Owen Moon, publisher of the two Winston-Salem newspapers, The Winston-Salem Journal and The Twin City Sentinel about creating a radio station. The call letters refer to the newspapers, "Winston-Salem Journal" plus "Sentinel".

WSJS signed on the air on April 17, 1930, Holy Thursday. Three days later, the station aired live coverage of the Easter Sunrise Service from God's Acre in Old Salem. That broadcast has continued every year since (except when there were technical problems in 2020 and a previous year's service was broadcast) and is believed to be the longest continuously airing special program in radio history.

With WSJS owned by the two local newspapers, the original studios were in the papers' newsroom in downtown Winston-Salem. The transmitter was also in that building. The antenna was a long wire suspended from two towers (one on the Journal Building and the other on the roof of the Carolina Theater building).

In 1933, WSJS became a CBS Radio Network affiliate, switching to the NBC Red Network in 1940. Gordon Gray bought the newspapers and the radio station in 1937, and Harold Essex of Chicago became the manager. Together, they made WSJS as important to the area as the newspapers, increasing the station's power and moving WSJS from 1310 to 600 kHz. WSJS had been powered at 100 watts at its founding but increased to 250 watts when it moved to AM 600, and 1,000 watts a short time later.

In 1941, an FM station, WMIT, was added, with its tower near Mount Mitchell, hence the call letters. The Radio Center Studios building at 419 Spruce Street was built for the stations in 1942. In 1947, 104.1 WSJS-FM (today WTQR) began in Winston-Salem.

WSJS added a TV station in 1953. Channel 12 WSJS-TV was co-located with WSJS 600 AM for a number of years. The newspapers were sold to Media General in 1968, but longtime publisher Gordon Gray formed Triangle Broadcasting to hold onto the WSJS-AM-FM-TV. Gray also acquired the cable franchise for Winston-Salem, Summit Cable. When the FCC ruled that one person could not own a television station and a cable system in the same market, Gray sold off WSJS-TV. It is now WXII-TV.

Wally Williams hosted "Carolina in the Morning" on WSJS 600 from 1954 to 1979. The show included the "good word for the day" and a daily devotional. Williams had started as an announcer on the TV station, where he continued to do the weather. When he retired, Winston-Salem mayor Wayne Corpening declared May 31 "Wally Williams Day." Wayne Willard did the news during most of Williams' years on the station, and also served as the station's news director.

George Lee joined WSJS radio in 1968. (*George Lee Bowermaster) Among his characters were Blue the Bionic Dog and Magnolia Sweetbreath. When signing off he would tell people to drive carefully so "that the life you save may be mine. Myself, I would rather be a little late than be the late George Lee." He and Tom Chambers would tell punch lines to jokes on the air—just the punch lines, because the jokes themselves were dirty. Before WSJS, he was on WAIR, and he was one of the "Good Guys" on WTOB.

(Note) A 100 milliwatt radio station used the call letters WSJS (initials of the stations' founders), and was located in Midland, Michigan. It was on the air on Friday and Saturday nights from 8 PM to 1 AM, and the whole week between Christmas and New Year's. It operated at 1610 on the AM dial from April 5, 1968, through December 31, 1970, and was geared towards teenagers.

1970s
In 1976 Lee became program director of WSJS and WTQR. (*George Brown was Program Director in 1979 and at least as late as 1982). Lee left radio in 1982 but his career included roles in several movies and TV shows, and he was the narrator of Beyond the Wheel, a program about NASCAR on The Speed Channel.

In 1979, Glenn Scott moved from WXII to WSJS to replace Williams as morning host, a position he held for almost 30 years. For the last few years, he did the show from his home in Horse Shoe, near Hendersonville, after moving closer to his children. He almost considered retiring but changed his mind when the station made arrangements for the remote broadcasts.

1980s
In 1982, former WTOB news Anchor Smith Patterson joined the station and in 1983 was made full-time by then station manager Roger Stockton. Patterson then joined Glenn Scott on the morning show for the rest of Scott's tenure 1984–2007. Patterson was with the station doing the morning news with JR Snider and also hosting the 5 a.m. Early Morning News With Smith Patterson until March, 2012.

In 1988, Bob Costner became WSJS news director, a position he would hold for nearly 20 years.

1990s
NewMarket Media Corp. sold WSJS and WTQR to Radio Equity Partners of Norwalk, Connecticut, in a deal completed in April 1994 and worth in excess of $100 million. The Connecticut company wanted to expand into the Southeast, looking for the best stations possible.

After more than 20 years, Wake Forest University stopped airing its football and basketball games on WSJS, moving to the first of several stronger FM stations. Gene Overby, also WSJS sports director prior to his death in 1989, was play-by-play announcer for Wake Forest for 17 years.

In August 1998, WSML in Graham, North Carolina, formerly a gospel music station, began airing the same programming as WSJS most of the time. The move was made to improve WSJS' coverage in the eastern Triad, particularly at night when WSJS must adjust its signal to protect several clear-channel stations on nearby frequencies. Legendary Greensboro DJ Dusty Dunn joined the stations. WSJS Program director Mike Fenley began a talk show on WSML which aired in the late morning, at the time WSJS was airing Dr. Laura. While WSJS aired Rush Limbaugh, WSML had Paul Harvey and religious programming. WSJS aired UNC football and basketball, while WSML carried N.C. State sports. Dunn left WSJS/WSML after a year because new station management wanted more of a focus on political talk.

WSML was the only area station airing the NHL Carolina Hurricanes early in the 1998–99 season. WSJS had the NFL Carolina Panthers and the NBA Charlotte Hornets.

WSJS and WTQR were sold to Clear Channel Communications in 1997.

2000s
When Clear Channel merged with AMFM, WSJS was sold to CBS Radio (then called Infinity) in 2000. The Infinity purchase meant WSJS dropped Paul Harvey and added Charles Osgood and The Dan Rather Report. CBS network newscasts replaced those from ABC Radio News.

WSJS carried the Winston-Salem Warthogs minor league baseball team for two seasons starting in 2003.

WSJS dropped Dr. Laura late in 2003, replacing her with Laura Ingraham in the late morning slot; Ingraham had been on WSJS late at night.

Beth Ann McBride was a producer and assistant continuity director in 2002 and 2003, and she became producer of the Don and Mike Show before returning to WSJS in December 2005 as program director and afternoon host, replacing Fenley.

On February 14, 2007, WSJS (along with its sister station WMFR and simulcast partner WSML) was sold by CBS to Raleigh-based Curtis Media Group. This move marries WSJS with FM news/talk station WZTK, which covers both the Triad and Triangle (as well as southern Virginia and as far south as Fayetteville).

This was the beginning of big changes at WSJS during 2007. McBride left her jobs as program director and host of the afternoon show "The Ride with McBride." News director Costner had already left the station for News 14 Carolina late in 2006. Ed Skurka, news director for Clear Channel's Greensboro-area stations, became WSJS/WMFR news anchor.

Also in 2007, Brian Freeman became news and programming director, as well as morning host, replacing Scott, who announced his retirement May 14. Smith Patterson and J. R. Snider remained a part of the show. 
Freeman left WSJS in December 2009 just before then Station Manager Tom Hamilton was stopped for drinking and driving while coming home from the annual North Carolina Wine Festival which his station promoted and ran.

Curtis Media Group announced that WSJS/WSML would no longer carry The Rush Limbaugh Show after December 31, 2009. The program moved to talk radio rival FM 94.5 WPTI, owned by iHeartMedia, which also owns the firm that syndicates Limbaugh, Premiere Networks.

2010s

The WSJS simulcast on WSML ended on July 15, 2010, after WSML began carrying an all-sports format in tandem with WMFR and WCOG. WSJS realigned its programming on March 13, 2012, when a locally produced show hosted by Brad Krantz and Britt Whitmire and the syndicated Neal Boortz and Clark Howard shows moved to WSJS, as well as sister station WPTK in Raleigh, from WZTK (which changed formats). WSJS also increased its news coverage, including the launch of an hour-long noon newscast.

On March 4, 2013, WSJS reunited with its former sister station WXII-TV 12 in a news sharing agreement. With the agreement, WXII 12 News at 6 p.m. started simulcasting on WSJS on March 4. The newscast was heard weeknights from 6:00-6:30 p.m. on WSJS followed by North Carolina News Network News.

On January 18, 2016, WSJS added more sports programming. Clark Howard's show was cut to two hours, while Dave Ramsey was dropped along with More with Matt Clark, produced by the station's operations manager. The Raleigh-based David Glenn Show was moved to live in the early afternoon, after being delayed until evening. Scott Hamilton of the Winston-Salem Journal, whose show was already on WMFR, WSML and WCOG, was added in the afternoon. CBS Sports Radio was added in the evening. Morning show The Triad's First News with J.R. Snider remained, along with the simulcast of the 6:00 news on WXII, plus a 6:30 evening newscast.

In 2016, after nearly 50 years on Fifth Street, WSJS announced its studios would move to a reconverted factory building in Kernersville.

Switch to All-Sports

The station ended its news/talk format on September 1, 2017, and changed to all-sports, including Fox Sports Radio programming, David Glenn's Raleigh-based sports show, and a locally produced afternoon show, One on One With The Schass with Kyle Schassburger. Schassburger was later replaced with The Drive with Josh Graham.

Outgoing morning host J.R. Snider said that "for the first time in 87 years, there will not be a live local morning show on WSJS." Concurrently, Curtis Media's existing sports stations — 1200 WSML in Graham, 1230 WMFR in High Point, and 1320 WCOG in Greensboro — began simulcasting with WSJS as the "WSJS Sports Network". AM 920 WPCM in Burlington-Graham was also added to the simulcast all-sports network. In March 2021, Curtis Media sold WCOG to Winston-Salem-Greensboro Broadcasting Co. and WCOG now is a sister station to WTOB and WWBG and is broadcasting oldies music.

In December 2021, WSJS was sold to Stuart Epperson Jr's Truth Broadcasting Company for $625,000. Truth Broadcasting owns several other stations in the market, including WTRU and WPOL. The sale was consummated on March 1, 2022.

On May 25, 2022, it was reported that WSJS would flip its format to talk & sports, on June 6, 2022.

In January 2023, vandals destroyed two of four towers in WSJS' array. The AM signal is off the air, as well as the FM translator W268CG at 101.5 FM. The station is currently airing using the three other FM translators that originate WSJS programming.

Prior to the attack, the station had filed a request with the FCC to move their transmitter location to a new site currently used by WPOL and WSMX. The move would see WSJS reduce power from 5,000 watts directional day and night to non-directional 1,700 watts day and 110 watts night.

References

External links 

FCC History Cards for WSJS

SJS
American Basketball Association flagship radio stations
Radio stations established in 1930
1930 establishments in North Carolina